Homoptera is a suborder of order Hemiptera that is considered by some taxonomists to be paraphyletic, and therefore deprecated (obsolete). It was therefore split into the suborders Sternorrhyncha, Auchenorrhyncha, and Coleorrhyncha. The earlier work was based on nuclear DNA, but more recent  phylogenetic analysis using mitochondrial DNA suggest that Homoptera may be a monophyletic group after all, a sister group of Heteroptera. The cause of the disparity in the analyses is suggested to be the long branch attraction effect in phylogenetic analysis, due to rapidly evolving DNA regions.

The Homoptera include the aphids, scale insects, cicadas, and leafhoppers, which all have sucking mouthparts.

References

Insect suborders
Hemiptera